Socastee High School (abbreviated SHS) is a large, three-story public high school with about 1,700 students located in Socastee, South Carolina in the  Myrtle Beach metro area. It is run by Horry County Schools.

Academics 
Socastee High School currently offers an IB program and several AP courses for advanced students. Socastee offers the IB Diploma Programme, and has been an IB World School since January 1997.

Sports 
Socastee High currently sponsors these interscholastic teams through its athletic department for both young men and women: wrestling, basketball, athletic training, varsity cheerleading, girls' lacrosse, boys' lacrosse, golf, football, girls' tennis, swimming, volleyball, baseball, cross country and men's tennis.

Awards and recognition 
Socastee High School won the 1988 National High School Mock Trial Championship, held in Dallas, Texas.

In 2010, Socastee High School made an appearance in Newsweek magazine's list of America's Best High Schools.

Notable alumni 

 Kiera Cass, writer of young adult fiction, best known for The Selection Series
 Chris Lemonis, college baseball coach
 Adena Leibman, Senior Advisor to the Under Secretary of Commerce for Oceans and Atmosphere for NOAA
 Wendi Nix, anchor and sports reporter for ESPN
 Hunter Renfrow, NFL wide receiver and two-time CFP National Champion with the Clemson Tigers
 Thad Viers, former Republican South Carolina Representative for District 68
 Heather Ammons Crawford, South Carolina State Representative for District 68 
Jill Dudley, SHS 2017 Alumna, the 85th Miss South Carolina.

See also
List of high schools in South Carolina

References

External links 

Socastee High School Shooting

Public high schools in South Carolina
Schools in Horry County, South Carolina
International Baccalaureate schools in South Carolina